Lanzl is a German surname. Notable people with the surname include:

Andrea Lanzl  (born 1987), German ice hockey player
Michaela Lanzl (born 1983), German ice hockey player, sister of Andrea

See also
Lanz (surname)
Lantz (surname)

German-language surnames